Realize or realise may refer to:
 Realize, an album by Eri Kitamura
 Realize, an album by Karsh Kale
 Realize (album), a 1989 album by Hideaki Tokunaga
 "Realize", a song by 2 Chainz from their album Pretty Girls Like Trap Music
 "Realize", a song by AC/DC from their 2020 album Power Up
 "Realize", a song by Codeine, from their EP Barely Real
 "Realize" (Colbie Caillat song), 2008
 "Realize" (Konomi Suzuki song), 2020
 "Realize", a song by Nami Tamaki from her 2004 album Greeting
 "Realise", a song by The Screaming Jets, from their 2000 album Scam
 "Realize/Take a Chance", a 2005 song by Melody
 "Realize", a song by Bad Gyal from her 2018 album Worldwide Angel

See also 
 Realization (disambiguation)